is an platform arcade game developed and released by Taito in 1984. In the game, the player controls a small yellow creature, Chack'n, with the objective being to retrieve hearts from a cave, all while avoiding the enemies contained within them. Chack'n also has the ability to deploy bombs, which can kill said enemies, which can bring bonuses depending on if the all or none of the enemies have been killed.

It is considered to be a spiritual predecessor of Bubble Bobble due to the shared characters and similar game structure. Home ports were released for the SG-1000, MSX, Family Computer, Sharp X1, NEC PC-6001 and NEC PC-8801. The arcade version would later be included via emulation in Taito Legends Power-Up, Taito Memories Pocket, Taito Memories Gekan, and Taito Legends 2. The Family Computer version would later be re-released on the Nintendo Wii and Nintendo 3DS via Virtual Console.

Gameplay

Chack'n Pop is a platform arcade game. The player controls Chack'n, a small yellow creature with extendable legs, through a series of single-screen mazes. He is capable of walking on floors or cei lings but not walls. He can climb steps and traverse high walls by extending his legs until he is tall enough to pass onto the next step. He is also capable of throwing hand grenades to his left or right which, after a short period, explode into a cloud of smoke. Separate fire buttons control rolling to the left or right. Chack'n is killed if caught by the explosion cloud. He is delayed in this process by a series of solid walls. In order to get past the walls, he must free hearts from cages using his hand grenades.

A further obstruction comes in the form of Monstas hatching from eggs. All or none of the Monstas in a level can be destroyed for a bonus at the end of the level. Each screen is played against a time limit, marked by a Mighta pushing a boulder along the top of the screen.

Development and release 
Chack'n Pop was released by Taito around April 1984 in Japan, despite the copyright notice of the game saying 1983. The game started off at Tôdai’s Microcomputer Club, as a game developed for the Hitachi Basic Master Level 3 by Hiroshi Sakai, a Game Arts developer who was a student at Tôdai at the time. Taito later bought the rights to the game, and started development on an arcade version of the game under the working name Chack'n Chack, with Hiroyuki Sakô on character and level design, and Jun Ishioka on programming. Sakô thought the main character in the original microcomputer version of the game wasn't cute, thus leading him to design the Chack'n character. Around the middle of development, they had to burn an EEPROM each time they wanted to check the on-screen colors, which made them design a daughterboard so that the colors could be displayed immediately without the need of an EEPROM.

Conversions 
Taito ported the game to the MSX, Family Computer, Sharp X1, NEC PC-6001 and NEC PC-8801. Sega developed and published a version of the game for the SG-1000.

An emulated arcade version is included in Taito Legends Power-Up, Taito Memories Pocket, Taito Memories Gekan, Taito Legends 2, and Taito Milestones. The Family Computer version was re-released on the Nintendo Wii and Nintendo 3DS via the Virtual Console service. A port of the arcade version was released on the PlayStation 4 and Nintendo Switch as part of the Arcade Archives initiative by Hamster Corporation. This port features online leaderboards and new gameplay modes.

The Family Computer version is included on the MyArcade Don Doko Don Pocket Player unit, along with the Family Computer version of Don Doko Don, as well as Don Doko Don 2. An emulated version of the arcade version would appear on the Taito Egret II Mini as part of its default game lineup.

Reception
Sakô felt the game flopped in Japanese arcades due to its difficulty. However, the home ports, specifically the Family Computer and MSX versions of the game, sold much better and became one of Taito's "top IPs".

Retrospective views on Chack'n Pop have been mostly negative. A mini review of the game on a retrospective of The NewZealand Story found in an issue of Retro Gamer claimed the game "wasn't a great platformer" due to how complex it is. PC Zone said the game "isn't much fun", despite the ideas it presented for the time, and the fact that it was Bubble Bobble's predecessor. Rhody Tobin of HonestGamers slammed the Family Computer version of the game for its controls, gameplay, and presentation, and while admitting that the game is "vaguely interesting", ended that it is "best forgotten". A more positive review of the game came from Alex Kidman of Kotaku Australia, where he briefly reviewed the Family Computer version of the game, and while he recommended it for fans of Bubble Bobble, he noted that it is a very different game compared to Bubble Bobble.

Legacy
Chack'n Pop is often considered to be one of the spiritual predecessors to Bubble Bobble, mostly due to the similar gameplay structure and shared characters. The Monstas and Mightas would later appear as common enemies in Bubble Bobble. Chack'n and other characters from Chack'n Pop has appeared in various other Taito games as cameos, such as Ben Bero Beh, Bubble Bobble, Bubble Memories, and NY Captor.

Notes

References

External links

1984 video games
Arcade video games
Bubble Bobble
FM-7 games
MSX games
NEC PC-6001 games
NEC PC-8801 games
Nintendo Entertainment System games
Nintendo Switch games
Platform games
PlayStation 4 games
SG-1000 games
Sharp MZ games
Sharp X1 games
Taito arcade games
Virtual Console games
Video games developed in Japan
Hamster Corporation games